Joakim Halvarsson (born March 12, 1972) is a Swedish ski mountaineer.

Halvarsson was born in Östersund and has been member of the national team since 2006. He started ski mountaineering in 2000 and competed first in the Swedish Cup Ski Mountaineering in 2005. Together with Patrik Nordin, André Jonsson and John Bergstedt, he placed sixth in the relay event of the 2007 European Championship of Ski Mountaineering.

External links 
 Joakim Halvarsson at skimountaineering.org

1972 births
Living people
Swedish male ski mountaineers
People from Östersund
Sportspeople from Jämtland County